Badi is a town and a nagar panchayat in Raisen district in the state of Madhya Pradesh, India.

Demographics

As of the 2011 Census of India, Badi had a population of 19,603. Males constitute 53% of the population and females 47%. Badi has an average literacy rate of 61%, higher than the national average of 59.5%; with 60% of the males and 40% of females literate. 17% of the population is under 6 years of age.

References

Cities and towns in Raisen district
Raisen